Bénie Adama Traoré (born 30 November 2002) is an Ivorian professional footballer who plays as a winger for Häcken.

Club career
After two years in ASEC Mimosas, Traoré joined BK Häcken in January 2021. He made his debut in a Svenska Cupen match against Dalkurd in February. He scored his first goal against Gauthiod in the Svenska Cupen on 27 February. He made his Allsvenskan debut on 24 April against Halmstads BK. In March 2022, during a Svenska Cupen match against Hammarby IF, his leg was severely injured and he was sidelined for 8 months. He signed a new contract with Häcken on 26 September 2022 and went on to win the 2022 Allsvenskan after recovering from his injury.

Career statistics

Club

Honours
Häcken
 Allsvenskan: 2022

References

External links
 
 Footballdatabase Profile
 Benie Traore at Häcken

2002 births
Living people
Ivorian footballers
Association football wingers
ASEC Mimosas players
BK Häcken players
Allsvenskan players
Ivorian expatriate footballers
Expatriate footballers in Sweden
Ivorian expatriate sportspeople in Sweden